Mascot is an unincorporated community in Harlan County, Nebraska, United States.

History
Mascot was first called Rouse until it was renamed by the railroad.

References

Populated places in Harlan County, Nebraska
Unincorporated communities in Nebraska